The Province of Languedoc is a former province of France.
Most of its territory is now contained in the modern-day region of Occitanie in Southern France. Its capital city was Toulouse. It had an area of approximately 42,700 square kilometers (16,490 square miles).

History
The Roman province of Gallia Narbonensis fell to the Visigothic Kingdom from the 5th to the 8th centuries. Occupied briefly by the Emirate of Córdoba between 719 and 759, it was conquered and incorporated into the Kingdom of the Franks by Pippin the Short in 759 following the Siege of Narbonne. Under the Carolingians, the counts of Toulouse were appointed by the royal court. Later, this office became hereditary. Part of the territory where Occitan was spoken came to be called langue d'oc, Lengadòc or Languedoc.

In the 13th century, the spiritual beliefs of the area were challenged by the See of Rome and the region became attached to the Kingdom of France following the Albigensian Crusade (1208–1229). This crusade aimed to put an end to what the Catholic Church considered the Cathar heresy, and enabled the Capetian dynasty to extend its influence south of the Loire. As part of this process, the former principalities of Trencavel (the Viscounty of Albi, Carcassona, Besièrs, Agde and Nîmes) were integrated into the Royal French Domain in 1224. The County of Toulouse followed them in 1271. The remaining feudal enclaves were absorbed progressively up to the beginning of the 16th century; the County of Gévaudan in 1258, the County of Melgueil (Mauguiò) in 1293, the Lordship of Montpellier in 1349 and the Viscounty of Narbonne in 1507.

The territory falling within the jurisdiction of the Estates of Languedoc, which convened for the first time in 1346, shrank progressively, becoming known during the Ancien Régime as the province of Languedoc.

The year 1359 marked a turning point in the history of the province. The three bailiwicks (sénéchaussées) of Bèucaire, Carcassona and Tolosa had the status of bonnes villes (towns granted privileges and protection by the king of France in return for providing a contingent of men at arms). In that year, the three entered into a perpetual union, after which their contribution of royal officers was summoned jointly rather than separately for each of the three sénéchaussées.

Towards the end of 14th century, the term "country of the three seneschalties" (pays des trois sénéchaussées), later to become known as Languedoc, designated the two bailiwicks of Bèucaire-Nîmes and Carcassona, and the eastern part of Tolosa (Toulouse), retained under the Treaty of Brétigny. At that time, the County of Foix, which belonged to the seneschal of Carcassona until 1333 before passing to Toulouse, ceased to belong to Languedoc.

In 1542, the province was divided into two généralités: Toulouse for Haut-Languedoc, and Montpellier for Bas-Languedoc. This lasted until the French Revolution in 1789. From the 17th century onward, there was only one intendance for the whole of Languedoc, with its seat in Montpellier.

Geographical extent

The traditional provinces of the kingdom of France were not formally defined. A province was simply a territory of common traditions and customs, but it had no political organization. Today, when people refer to the old provinces of France, they are referring to the gouvernements as they existed in 1789, before the French Revolution. Gouvernements were military regions established by the Crown in the middle of the 16th century; their territories closely matched those of the traditional provinces. However, in some cases, small provinces were merged with a large one into a single gouvernement, so gouvernements are not exactly the same as the traditional provinces.

Historically, the region was called the County of Toulouse, a county independent from the kings of France. After the French conquest the entire county was dismantled, the central part of it being now called Languedoc.

The gouvernement of Languedoc was created in the mid-16th century. In addition to Languedoc proper, it included the three small provinces of Gévaudan, Velay, and Vivarais (in its entirety), these three provinces being to the northeast of Languedoc. The provinces of Quercy and Rouergue, despite their old ties with Toulouse, were not incorporated into the gouvernement of Languedoc. They were attached to the gouvernement of Guienne and its far-away capital Bordeaux. This decision was probably intentional, to avoid reviving the independently spirited County of Toulouse. In the rest of this article, Languedoc refers to the territory of this gouvernement of Languedoc.

Area and location of Languedoc
The province of Languedoc covered an area of approximately 42,700 km² (16,490 sq. miles) in the central part of southern France, roughly the region between the river Rhône (border with Provence) and the Garonne (border with Gascony), extending northwards to the Cévennes and the Massif Central (border with Auvergne).

Capital
As the center of the County of Toulouse and the regional parlement, Toulouse is often considered the "capital" of Languedoc. On maps (both ancient and modern) showing the provinces (i.e., gouvernements) of France in 1789, it is always marked as such. However, the intricate entanglement of administrations and jurisdictions permitted Montpellier to also claim that distinction. In the 18th century, the monarchy clearly favored Montpellier, a city much smaller than Toulouse, with less history, and with fewer autonomous local authorities such as Toulouse's parlement and capitoulate.

Old administrative divisions
The governors of Languedoc resided in Pézenas, on the Mediterranean coast, away from Toulouse but close to Montpellier. In time they had increased their power well beyond military matters, and had become the real administrators and executive power of the province, a trend seen in the other gouvernements of France, but particularly acute in Languedoc, where the duke of Montmorency, governor of Languedoc, even openly rebelled against the king, then was defeated and beheaded in Toulouse in 1632 by the order of Richelieu. The kings of France became fearful of the power of the governors, so after King Louis XIV (the Sun King) they had to reside in Versailles and were forbidden to enter the territory of their gouvernement. Thus the gouvernements became hollow structures, but they still carried a sense of the old provinces, and so their names and limits have remained popular until today.

For administrative purposes, Languedoc was divided in two généralités, the généralité of Toulouse and the généralité of Montpellier, the combined territory of the two generalities exactly matching that of the gouvernement of Languedoc. At the head of a generality was an intendant, but in the case of Languedoc there was only one intendant responsible for both generalities, and he was often referred to as the intendant of Languedoc, even though technically speaking he was in fact the intendant of the generality of Toulouse and intendant of the generality of Montpellier. The generality of Toulouse is also referred to as Upper Languedoc (Haut-Languedoc), while the generality of Montpellier, down to the level of the sea, is referred to as Lower Languedoc (Bas-Languedoc). The intendants of Languedoc resided in Montpellier, and they had a sub-delegate in Toulouse. Montpellier was chosen on purpose to diminish the power of Toulouse, whose parlement was very influential, and which symbolized the old spirit of independence of the county of Toulouse. The intendants replaced the governors as administrators of Languedoc, but appointed and dismissed at will by the king, they were no threat to the central state in Versailles. By 1789 they were the most important element of the local administration of the kingdom.

For judicial and legislative matters, Languedoc was overseen by the Parliament of Toulouse, founded in the middle of the 15th century. It was the first parlement created outside of Paris by the kings of France in order to be the equivalent of the Parlement of Paris in the far-away southern territories of the kingdom. The jurisdiction of the Parlement of Toulouse included the whole of the territory of the gouvernement of Languedoc, but it also included the province of Rouergue, most of the province of Quercy, and a part of Gascony. The Parlement of Toulouse was the supreme court of justice for this vast area of France, the court of last resort whose rulings could not be appealed, not even to the Parlement of Paris. The Parlement of Toulouse could also create case law through its decisions, as well as interpret the law. It was also in charge of registering new royal edicts and laws, and could decide to block them if it found them to be in contravention with the liberties and laws of Languedoc.

Finally, for purposes of taxation, Languedoc was ruled by the States of Languedoc, whose jurisdiction included only Languedoc proper (and Albigeois), but not Gévaudan, Velay, and Vivarais, which kept each their own provincial states until 1789. Languedoc proper was one of the very few provinces of France which had the privilege to decide over tax matters, the kings of France having suppressed the provincial states in most other provinces of the kingdom. This was a special favor from the kings to ensure that an independently spirited region far-away from Versailles would remain faithful to the central state. The States of Languedoc met in many different cities, and for some time they established themselves in Pézenas, but in the 18th century they were relocated definitively to Montpellier, where they met once a year, until 1789.

For Christian religious purposes, Languedoc was also divided into a certain number of ecclesiastical provinces, including the archdiocese of Toulouse, the archdiocese of Narbonne, and the archdiocese of Albi.

Modern administrative divisions
Between 1956 and 2016, the province of Languedoc was divided between four :

Population and cities

On the traditional territory of the province of Languedoc there live approximately 3,650,000 people (as of 1999 census), 52% of these in the Languedoc-Roussillon région, 35% in the Midi-Pyrénées région, 8% in the Rhône-Alpes région, and 5% in the Auvergne région.

The territory of the former province shows a stark contrast between some densely populated areas (coastal plains as well as metropolitan area of Toulouse in the interior) where density is between 150 inhabitants per km²/390 inh. per sq. mile (coastal plains) and 300 inh. per km²/780 inh. per sq. mile (plain of Toulouse), and the hilly and mountainous interior where density is extremely low, the Cévennes area in the south of Lozère having one of the lowest densities of Europe with only 7.4 inhabitants per km² (19 inh. per sq. mile).

The five largest metropolitan areas on the territory of the former province of Languedoc are (as of 1999 census): Toulouse (964,797), Montpellier (459,916), Nîmes (221,455), Béziers (124,967), and Alès (89,390).

The population of the former province of Languedoc is currently the fastest-growing in France, and also among the fastest-growing in Europe, as an increasing flow of people from northern France and the north of Europe relocating to the sunbelt of Europe, in which Languedoc is located. Growth is particularly strong in the metropolitan areas of Toulouse and Montpellier, which are the two fastest growing metropolitan areas in Europe at the moment. However, the interior of Languedoc is still losing inhabitants, which increases the difference of density that was mentioned.

Population of the coast of Languedoc as well as the region of Toulouse is rather young, educated, and affluent, whereas in the interior the population tends to be much older, with significantly lower incomes, and with a lower percentage of high school and especially college graduates.

Economy

Agriculture
Languedoc is a significant producer of wine. Today it produces more than a third of the grapes in France, and is a focus for outside investors. Wines from the Mediterranean coast of Languedoc are labeled as Languedoc, those from the interior have other labels such as Fronton, Gaillac, or Limoux to the west – and Côtes du Rhône towards the east.

Other crops include wheat (the traditional crop which made the fortune of the landlords and parliamentarians based in Toulouse, and for whose trade the famous Canal du Midi was built), maize (the new and nowadays most common crop in the region), olives (only on the Mediterranean coast of Languedoc), fruit, and rice (in some coastal areas). In the hilly and mountainous areas of the interior, sheep and goats are raised for meat and cheese. The coastal area is, naturally, a source of fish and shellfish.

Industry

Aerospace (Airbus, CNES, etc.), electronics (Freescale, etc.), and bio-tech industries in Toulouse; high-tech, electronics, and computer (IBM) industries in Montpellier; pharmaceutical industry (Pierre Fabre Group) in Castres.

There is also a significant chemical sector in Toulouse, which has been quite battered since the terrible explosion of AZF on 21 September 2001. It has been decided that chemical industries would be moved out of Toulouse, and a large campus devoted to cancer research and bio-tech R&D will be opened on the site.

Elsewhere in the region industries are small and in decline, in particular around the formerly mining areas of Alès and Carmaux in the interior of the region.

Services and tourism
Services are the largest sector of the economy in the region. In particular, government services employ a significant part of the workforce, especially in small towns. Key administrations have been relocated to the region, such as France's National Meteorology Office (Météo-France) relocated from Paris to Toulouse in 1982.

The area is also a major tourist destination. There exists three types of tourism. First, a massive summer tourism industry on the coast, with huge sea resorts such as Cap d'Agde, Palavas-les-Flots, or Le Grau-du-Roi, built in the 1970s.

Tourism related to history and art is also strong, as the region contains the historic cities of Carcassonne, Toulouse, Montpellier, countless Roman monuments (such as the Roman arenas in Nîmes), medieval abbeys, Romanesque churches, and old castles (such as the ruined Cathar castles in the mountains of Corbières, testimony of the bloody Albigensian Crusade).

More recently, "green" and sports tourism is on the rise, with the gorges of the Tarn, the Ardèche Gorges, as well as the vast preserved expanses of Cévennes, Ardèche, Lauragais, and other sites.

Tourism on the Canal du Midi combines history (for example viewing the nine locks of Fonseranes near Béziers) with activities such as boating on the Canal, and walking or cycling on the towpaths.

Toulouse and Montpellier are also common places for business congresses and conventions.

In April 2019, The Guardian's travel section included two Languedoc locations in its list of 20 of the most beautiful villages in France. The two were Saint-Guilhem-le-Désert with "one of the finest examples of Romanesque architecture in the region" and Estaing, whose "narrow streets have hardly changed over the centuries".

Sports
Rugby union is the "national" sport in Languedoc, unlike most other parts of France where football is more popular. The Toulouse rugby club (Stade Toulousain) is one of the most successful in Europe; it regularly competes for the French championship and has won four European titles (1996, 2003, 2005, and 2010) in the ten years of the European championship's existence.

Bullfighting and other bull-related events are popular in the eastern part of Languedoc. Sea jousts (Joutes nautiques) are held on the coast. Dating from the 11th century, this sport has local leagues and attracts large crowds.

Property

Property in the Languedoc is quite varied and ranges from newly built villas with swimming pools and tennis courts, to old village houses set into the old ramparts of ancient fortified towns. Some of these village houses date back a very long time. A small house in the village of Magalas, Hérault , has a date of the 13th century carved into its stonework. Being a large area, the type of property available in Languedoc varies a lot, from apartments in beach resorts such as Cap D'Agde to isolated bastides in the rural interior.

See also
 French wine
 Languedoc wine
 Languedoc-Roussillon
 Midi-Pyrénées
 Occitania
 Septimania timeline
 List of Governors of Languedoc
 Émile Mazuc, scholar of the Languedocien language

Notes

External links

 Languedoc-Roussillon Tourist Board Official Tourism Website for the Region
 The Canal du Midi at Béziers Official Béziers Website
 The Languedoc-Roussillon Official Site of the Région. 
 The Hérault tourist board website Department of Hérault in Languedoc Région. All informations to discover Hérault and to book your holidays in Languedoc. Free brochures and lodging.
 An introduction to the Languedoc for tourists including regional overview and main tourist attractions.
 Atlas historique de la province de Languedoc, de l'époque romaine à nos jours, by Élie Pélaquier, CNRS. 
 The Languedoc and Roussillon history, geography, climate, cities, towns and historic monuments.

 
Former provinces of France
Wine regions of France